Nidhi Yasha (born 26 April 1983) is an Indian costume designer. Nidhi designs costumes for Zee TV's Buddha and Star Plus TV series Mahabharat (2013 TV series)(2013) with Bhanu Athaiya as her consulting faculty for the show. Yasha said they studied over 450 books related to period textiles, costume and jewellery to arrive at the look for the show.

Early life and education
Nidhi Yasha was born in Patna in 1983. She studied at St.Joseph's Convent High School, Patna. She graduated from NIFT, Delhi in the year 2005.

Career
Nidhi Yasha came to Mumbai in 2008, and handled the menswear division for a retail brand, Wadhawan lifestyle- India from November 2008 to March 2009. She started designing costumes in 2009. Nidhi created the costumes and styled the look for shows like Ramleela – Ajay Devgn Ke Saath, Devon Ka Dev Mahadev, Chandragupta Maurya, Shobha Somnath Ki, Navya, Anhoniyon Ka Andhera, Durga, Buddha, Savitri, Jodha-Akbar, Mahabharat and films like Haunted, Jal, 1920 Evil Returns, Dangerous Ishhq, Maximum and Zilla Ghaziabad, Policegiri

Recognition
She won an Indian Television Academy Award and Indian Telly award for her work in Shobha Somnath Ki, on Zee TV.

Nidhi had worked as a costume designer for Swastik Pictures from 2009 to 2011. She was invited by the East West Center Gallery to exhibit her works and to give guest lectures on Indian costume design at the University of Hawaii in September–October 2013.

References

1983 births
Living people
Indian costume designers
Indian women fashion designers
Artists from Patna
Women artists from Bihar